Soekarno–Hatta Airport Railink  is an airport rail link service in Greater Jakarta, Indonesia. This airport rail link was built to cut travel time from the Jakarta city center to the airport, as roads connecting the Soekarno–Hatta International Airport (SHIA) and Jakarta city center are frequently affected by traffic congestion.

At present commuter service is operational between SHIA and Manggarai railway station, while express service is still at planning stage.

The Soekarno–Hatta ARS is the second airport rail link in Indonesia connecting passenger between city centre and airport after Kualanamu ARS.

Background
The idea of developing the airport railway system reportedly came up in the 1990s. However, the project plan was officially solidified only in 2011 with the issuing of a presidential regulation, Keppres No. 83 Year 2011, which assigned PT Angkasa Pura II and PT Kereta Api Indonesia to jointly carry out the project. The project suffered long setbacks due to disputed land requisition issue for construction of the new rail track and also frequent plan changes. The railway was opened between SHIA and BNI City on 26 December 2017 and officially inaugurated on 2 January 2018.  Services were extended to Manggarai on 5 September 2019.

At first this project was planned to only connect between Manggarai station at South Jakarta and SHIA station at Tangerang.  An expansion to connect to Jakarta Kota station at West Jakarta was announced in 2017, but is not operational as of March 2019.  The plan is to operate Jakarta Kota services via Kampung Bandan and Duri on existing track.

Route
There were 24 kilometers of existing train line from Manggarai to Batuceper and 12 kilometers of new track were built from Batuceper to SHIA station.  At Duri, the trains reverse direction.

At present passengers can board the train from Manggarai, BNI City, Duri, Batuceper and SHIA stations. Two new railway stations, SHIA and BNI City, were newly constructed, while others were renovated to serve airport passengers.

Starting 19 June 2018, a limited number of trains were extended to Bekasi Station, serving Bekasi in West Java, a satellite town within Greater Jakarta,. Services to Bekasi were discontinued in September 2019.

Stations
The boarding stations for Soekarno–Hatta ARS are:

When Manggarai station was still under renovation, BNI City station was used as the temporary terminus for the city center. At Manggarai station, there is separate entrance gate for airport train, and the train operates from platforms 8 and 9.

Operations and schedule
The airport rail link services connect Jakarta city center (at Manggarai and Sudirman Baru) with Soekarno–Hatta International Airport. The journey takes approximately 46 minutes from BNI City station (previously known as Sudirman Baru station) to  station. Each train has the capacity to carry up to 272 passengers and has the capacity to serve about 5,000 passengers with 80 trips a day.  However, as of January 2019 ridership has not met expectations, with the service operating at only approximately 30% of capacity. As of April 2021, there are two separate classes, Premium and Executive, with separate schedules and trainsets.

As of March 2019, the airport train operates every 30 minutes in both directions, with services between 4:51 AM and 9:51 PM from BNI City and 6:20 AM to 11:20 PM from SHIA. The trip takes approximately 48 minutes.

At its opening, ticket price for each journey is IDR70,000 (equivalent to approximately US$5). Although initially the price point for each journey was set at IDR 100,000, government analysis recommended for a lower price point due to concern that that price would have been too expensive for consumers. Gradually after it, Railink offers progressive price based on origin and destination stations, offering lower prices for trips not originating/destined to Soekarno-Hatta Airport. Maximum ticket price for the Premium class trains introduced in April 2021 is IDR35.000. Cash payment is not available. Passengers can only book train tickets using credit and debit cards, as well as electronic money via Railink app available for smartphones or vending machines at stations. Executive class passengers can also pay directly on ticket gates using prepaid cards.

Skytrain

The airport shuttle, Skytrain is the 3.05 kilometres Automated People Mover System (APMS) serves to connect Soekarno-Hatta Airport Terminals 1, 2, 3 and SHIA railway station free of charge. Skytrain takes 5 minutes from one terminal to another, with 7 minutes needed to get from Terminal 2 to Terminal 3.

The airport Skytrain shuttle is integrated to SHIA railway station, from where passengers can conveniently travel to–and from–Jakarta city center by train. Skytrain operating schedule is accessible online and through the Indonesia Airport website and smartphone application. Skytrain has been operational since 17 September 2017.

Proposed SHIA–HPIA express airport rail link 
An express train service is now under planning stage to connect Soekarno–Hatta International Airport with Halim Perdanakusuma Airport. Completion of this line is expected to be completed at the very earliest in 2019. At first this project was solely planned to be built as an  express line between Manggarai Station at South Jakarta and Soekarno–Hatta International Airport via Angke and Pluit, which would be a public–private partnership project. Later the route was extended from Manggarai to Halim Perdanakusuma Airport, which is in East Jakarta. The 33 kilometer project, proposed as Halim-Cawang-Manggarai-Tanah Abang-Sudirman-Pluit Terminal 2 and 3 SHIA stretch route, has been proposed to include a combination of surface-underground-elevated tracks. The express train is projected to take 30 minutes to connect the two main airports that serve the Greater Jakarta area.

See also

Soekarno–Hatta International Airport 
Kualanamu Airport Rail Link
Minangkabau Airport Rail Link
Adisumarmo Airport Rail Link

References

Airport rail links in Indonesia
Rapid transit in Indonesia
Soekarno–Hatta International Airport
Transport in Jakarta
Transport in Banten
Passenger rail transport in Indonesia
2017 establishments in Indonesia
Railway lines opened in 2017